The Classic Motor Cycle is a UK motorcycle magazine originally launched in 1981 with six editions a year as a spin-off from UK newspaper-format Motor Cycle Weekly (previously historically known as The Motor Cycle) as  under then Editor-in-Chief Mick Woollett at IPC, Surrey House, Sutton, Surrey.

Editor and driving-force Bob Currie based at Lynton House, Birmingham, was historically a senior contributor in the 1960s to Motor Cycle (renamed from The Motor Cycle in 1962) with the title of Midland Editor, and during the 1970s with the same publication, by then using the name Motor Cycle Weekly.

Having well-established archival links to The Motor Cycle which itself had origins back to 1903, the first edition was dated June/July 1981.

As had occurred with (The) Motor Cycle, The Classic Motor Cycle title changed hands several times, being originally published by IPC Business Press between 1981 and 1983, then by East Midland Allied Press (EMAP) from 1984. Purchased in 1998 by Mortons Media Group, it is now published by their subsidiary Mortons Motorcycle Media. Featuring all marques of classic motorcycles with an emphasis on racing and performance bikes, editor James Robinson says he is "not just interested in classics, but in all manner of motorcycles and motorcycle-related sport."

Features
The magazines contains articles on classic motorcycles, technical articles, and regular features including:

 Archive photographs
 News from the world of classic motorcycles
 Featured classic bikes
 Product reviews
 Technical features
 In the spotlight
 Profiles of famous motorcyclists
 You were asking (readers questions)
 Buyers Guide
 Diary and classic motorcycle events

References

External links
 

1983 establishments in the United Kingdom
Monthly magazines published in the United Kingdom
Motorcycle magazines published in the United Kingdom
Magazines established in 1983
Mass media in Lincolnshire